The 2019 FIA World Rallycross Championship presented by Monster Energy was the sixth season of the FIA World Rallycross Championship, an auto racing championship recognised by the Fédération Internationale de l'Automobile (FIA) as the highest class of international rallycross.

Timmy Hansen won the Drivers' Championship on countback after finishing with the same number of points as Andreas Bakkerud, winning based on his four event wins to Bakkerud's one. Team Hansen MJP won the Teams' Championship.

Calendar
The 2019 championship was contested over ten rounds in Europe, Africa, the Middle East and North America.

The following events are scheduled to take place as part of the 2019 championship:

Calendar changes
The calendar was trimmed from twelve rounds to ten with the removal of the World RX of Portugal, World RX of the United States and the World RX of Germany from the schedule.
A new round, the World RX of Abu Dhabi, was added as the opening round of the championship.
The World RX of Belgium moved from  Circuit Jules Tacheny Mettet to Circuit de Spa-Francorchamps.
The World RX of Canada will be a joint event with the Americas Rallycross Championship for the second consecutive time, and it is also the only combined round on the schedule.

Entries

Supercar

RX2

Team changes
 Team Peugeot Total and PSRX Volkswagen Sweden all withdrew from the championship after the 2018 season.
 Monster Energy RX Cartel joined the championship, fielding two Audi S1s.
 GC Kompetition will run a second team, GCK Academy, comprising two Renault Clios.
 EKS Sport lost its factory backing from Audi and reduced from two cars to one.
 ES Motorsport-Labas GAS entered the championship running a single Škoda Fabia.

Driver changes
 Following the withdrawal of their respective teams, reigning World Champion Johan Kristoffersson, Petter Solberg, Sébastien Loeb and Robin Larsson all left the Championship.
 Andreas Bakkerud and Liam Doran left EKS Audi Sport and GC Kompetition respectively to join Monster Energy RX Cartel.
 Guillaume De Ridder and Cyril Raymond moved up from RX2 and ERX respectively with GCK Academy.
 Krisztián Szabó moved up from ERX with EKS Sport.
 2018 European Rallycross Super1600 champion, Rokas Baciuška, joined the championship with ES Motorsport-Labas GAS but he was forced to cut relationship with the team so he only did do the two first rounds of the season.

Results and standings
World Championship points are scored as follows:

A red background denotes drivers who did not advance from the round

FIA World Rallycross Championship for Drivers

a Loss of 15 championship points – stewards' decision
b Loss of 10 championship points – stewards' decision

FIA World Rallycross Championship for Teams

1 – Team STARD ran two different specifications of car at rounds 1–3 and therefore were ineligible to score teams points at these events.

RX2 International Series Drivers' Championship

References

External links

Official FIA World Rallycross of Great Britain 

 
World Rallycross Championship seasons
World Rallycross Championship